Rasul Tsikhayeu is a Belarusian freestyle wrestler. He won one of the bronze medals in the 86 kg event at the 2020 European Wrestling Championships held in Rome, Italy.

Career 

In 2016, he competed at the European Olympic Qualification Tournament hoping to qualify for the 2016 Summer Olympics in Rio de Janeiro, Brazil. In 2020, he competed in the men's 86 kg event at the Individual Wrestling World Cup held in Belgrade, Serbia.

In 2021, he competed in the men's 86 kg event at the World Wrestling Championships held in Oslo, Norway where he was eliminated in his first match.

Major results

References

External links 
 

Living people
Year of birth missing (living people)
Place of birth missing (living people)
Belarusian male sport wrestlers
European Wrestling Championships medalists
21st-century Belarusian people